SolGold plc  is an emerging copper-gold major focussed on the discovery, definition and development of its copper-gold deposits in Ecuador. The company is listed on the London and Toronto stock exchanges.

SolGold's board and management is made up of professionals who have extensive knowledge in exploration, mine development, investment, finance and law. They hold approximately 15.1% of the company's issued share capital.

The company floated on 10 February 2006, and is focussed on the development of its projects in Ecuador.

History
In December 2009, SolGold announced that it had acquired 100% of the share capital in Acapulco Mining Pty Ltd, giving it access to several projects in Queensland, Australia. It was then announced in July 2009 that SolGold had raised £1.6 million ($19m SBD) to fund additional drilling at the Rannes and Mount Perry projects. The money was raised through the issue of 33.1 million shares, which were sold to private and institutional investors. SolGold's directors collectively bought 7.5 million shares.

In June 2010, SolGold's former CEO, Nicholas Mather, spoke at the 69th Minesite Mining Forum in London, England.

On 23 September 2010, in what raised SolGold's share price by almost 300%, it announced that 157 samples from its project on the Fauro Island had returned 97.6 grams per tonne (g/t) gold, and 90.1g/t silver. The news also gave huge gains to D'Aguilar Gold, a company which trades on the Australian Securities Exchange and owns 35.2 million shares in SolGold.

Cascabel
On 11 April 2012, it was announced that SolGold had acquired the right to buy up to 85% of a highly prospective gold-copper-silver project in Ecuador, after signing a binding letter of intent with Cornerstone Capital Resources, a Canadian mining company which is listed on the TSX Venture Exchange. Just over two months later, it was announced that both parties had finalised the agreement, and a $2.8 million first year exploration programme had begun.

Following a magnetic and radiometric survey of Cascabel, as well as soil sampling and rock alteration mapping, the results were said to be both "“very encouraging" and  "“extremely prospective". Trench sampling also confirmed outcropping gold-copper mineralisation. In late January 2013, it was announced that after channel sampling at the Alpapa Creek area of the project, a "significant" gold-copper porphyry was located.

After raising a further £1.8 million through a share placement scheme in April, on 2 May SolGold announced that it was ready to award a drill contract for the project. "Six drilling contractors have been invited to tender for the phase 1 drilling programme at Cascabel and five have visited the Cascabel concession and Alpala prospect. Four quotations have been received, with the remaining two due in the next week," SolGold told Proactive Investors.

Top Represented Shareholders

Project areas

Board of Directors and key personnel

References

External links

Gold mining companies of Australia
Copper mining companies of Australia
Companies listed on the Toronto Stock Exchange
Companies listed on the London Stock Exchange